"Hearts Ain't Gonna Lie" is a song by British singer-songwriter Arlissa and British DJ and record producer Jonas Blue. It was released as a digital download on 5 January 2018 via Virgin EMI Records.

Music video
A music video to accompany the release of "Hearts Ain't Gonna Lie" was first released onto YouTube on 18 January 2018 at a total length of three minutes and twenty-two seconds.

Charts

Weekly charts

Year-end charts

Certifications

References

2018 songs
2018 singles
Jonas Blue songs
Arlissa songs
Virgin EMI Records singles
Songs written by Jonas Blue
Songs written by Arlissa